Henk Wullems (21 January 1936 – 15 August 2020) was a Dutch association football manager.

In the early sixties he was a defender playing for Kooger Football Club (nl) and Racing Club Heemstede. Wullems was the manager of, among others, the eredivisie teams NAC Breda (1972–75), SBV Vitesse (1977–83), Go Ahead Eagles (1983–86), and AZ (1990–93). From 1996 to 1997 he was manager of the Indonesia national football team, winning a silver medal with them at the 1997 Southeast Asian Games. From 2000 to 2007 he managed a number of Indonesia Super League teams, becoming champion with three of them. Henk Wullems died on 15 August 2020 due to illness after cerebral infarction.

Honours

Player
KFC
 Eerste Divisie: 1959–60

Manager
NAC Breda
 KNVB Cup: 1972–73

SBV Vitesse
 Eerste Divisie: 1976–77

Bandung Raya
 Liga Indonesia Premier Division: 1995–96

Indonesia
 Southeast Asian Games silver medal: 1997

References

1936 births
2020 deaths
Indonesia national football team managers
Dutch football managers
Dutch expatriate football managers
Blauw-Wit Amsterdam managers
Expatriate football managers in Indonesia
Willem II (football club) managers
NAC Breda managers
SBV Vitesse managers
Go Ahead Eagles managers
AZ Alkmaar managers
Excelsior Rotterdam managers
Footballers from Zaanstad
Racing Club Heemstede players
Dutch footballers
Association football defenders
Dutch expatriate sportspeople in Indonesia